Peaceful indicates a state of, or inclination for, peace.

Peaceful may also refer to:
 Peaceful (film), a 2021 French drama
 Peaceful (horse), a racehorse
 "Peaceful" (song), by Kenny Rankin